Iryna Shtanhyeyeva (born 8 February 1982) is a Ukrainian sprint athlete who specializes in the 200 metres.

In individual competition she competed at the 2007 European Indoor Championships and the 2007 World Championships without reaching the final, but she won the gold medal at the 2007 Summer Universiade. Here she also won a bronze medal in the 4 x 400 metres relay.

She also competed in relay at the 2005 World Championships without reaching the final. At the 2007 World Championships the Ukrainian team failed to finish the race.

Her personal best times are 7.24 seconds in the 60 metres (indoor), achieved in January 2004 in Zaporizhia; 11.31 seconds in the 100 metres, achieved in May 2005 in Donetsk; and 22.72 seconds in the 200 metres, achieved in June 2007 in Yalta.

Competition record

References

1982 births
Living people
Ukrainian female sprinters
Universiade medalists in athletics (track and field)
Universiade gold medalists for Ukraine
Universiade bronze medalists for Ukraine
Medalists at the 2007 Summer Universiade